The Armory Center for the Arts, also known as the Armory, is a 501(c)(3) nonprofit visual arts organization located in Pasadena, California. The Armory provides community arts education programs for all ages and exhibitions of contemporary art, most of which are offered at no cost. Founded in 1989, the organization is housed in a renovated California National Guard Armory, from which its name is derived.

Overview 
Founded in 1989, Armory Center for the Arts is a 501(c)(3) nonprofit visual arts organization based in Pasadena, California. With roots going back to 1947, the organization's main campus is located inside a renovated 1930s California National Guard Armory, from which its name is derived.

Deeply committed to public access and education, the Armory presents contemporary art exhibitions, performances, and art education experiences for all ages at its main facility and at satellite locations throughout Pasadena and Los Angeles County.  The Armory designs its exhibitions and education programs to work together to offer innovative experiences for all visitors.  

At the core of the Armory's work is a deep commitment to social justice through arts education. A key goal of the Armory's mission is to provide engaging, high-quality art classes and art experiences throughout the region's historically underfunded, systems-impacted neighborhoods in order to advance cultural equity. Over 80% of programming serves this population. Most Armory programs are offered at no cost to participants.

The mission of Armory Center for the Arts is to nurture their community and its young people by creating, learning, and presenting art to advance equity and social justice.  Considered to be a leader for contemporary arts exhibitions community arts education, the organization "envisions joyful, healthy, and equitable communities shaped by imagination, creativity, and diverse voices."   Three themes that have been constant throughout the Armory's history are the exhibition of contemporary artists, their engagement as educators, and leadership in responding to the artistic needs of its community.

Programs and Services

Contemporary Art Exhibitions 
Deeply committed to public access and education, the Armory presents art exhibitions, performances, and art education experiences for all ages at its main facility and at satellite locations throughout Pasadena and Los Angeles County. This includes rigorously researched and professionally presented exhibitions of contemporary visual art and performance-based work, screenings, publications, lectures, and panels onsite as well as temporary installations at off-site venues, all of which are free to the public. Former Director of the Whitney Museum of American Art David Ross once observed that the Armory “has a reputation for hitting above its weight,” an acknowledgement of the Armory's curatorial team.

Notable recent exhibitions have included a survey of artists Nancy Buchanan, Marcia Hafif, and Barbara T. Smith organized by guest curator Michael Ned Holte; a survey exhibition of Alison Saar, co-presented by The Benton Museum of Art at Pomona College; the first major survey of Pasadena-based experimental filmmaker and painter Sara Kathryn Arledge; an historical survey of underground art made Guadalajara, Mexico City, and Monterrey in the 1990s, presented as part of the Getty's Pacific Standard Time LA/LA initiative; and a group exhibition celebrating the life of noted science fiction author and Pasadena native Octivia E. Butler, organized and presented by Los Angeles-based nonprofit art organization Clockshop.

The Armory's current Chief Curator and Director of Exhibitions Programs is Irene Georgia Tsatsos, a position she has held since 2010. Tsatsos was preceded by Director of Gallery Programs Jay Belloli (1990-2010).

The Armory's inaugural exhibition entitled "Pasadena Armory Show 1989" was curated by USC Atelier Gallery director Noel Korten and planned by Ann Barrett for the Fellows of Contemporary Art, a group founded in 1975 to underwrite exhibitions by contemporary artists after the demise of the Pasadena Art Museum. Artists in exhibition included Carole Caroompas, Karen Carson, Michael Davis, James Doolin, Scott Grieger, Raul Guerrero, William Leavitt, Jerry McMillan, Michael C. McMillen, Margit Omar, John Outterbridge, Ann Page, and John Valadez.

Children Investigate the Environment 
Launched in 1986, Children Investigate the Environment is the Armory flagship program and its longest-running, pre-dating the organization's founding by three years. When it launched, there were few organizations integrating visual arts with science as a teaching strategy to engage children who learn in nontraditional ways. The program continues to be offered at no cost to students thanks to continued support from private foundations.

Armory Teaching Artists take Pasadena public schoolchildren into nearby natural environments such as Eaton Canyon to learn about environmental and physical sciences through the lens of visual arts. The multi-week program's goal is to help children to hone critical thinking skills, make real-world connections to classroom learning, and foster an appreciation for natural environments.

CIE students keep an artist's journal where they take field notes and create observational drawings of different native plant specimens. They also create sculptures of cacti, fossils, and explore solar energy by using found objects in the field to create sun prints, also known as cyanotypes.

Studio Program 
The Armory's on-site Studio department manages 400 tuition-based art classes taught by 35 teaching artists, serves over 1,500 students (ages 2 to adult), and awards more than $100,000 in tuition assistance. Armory teaching artists are seasoned educators and practicing artists with advanced degrees from the nation's top art schools. The organization offers full scholarships and pre-loaded public transportation cards for teens age 12-18 attending Pasadena public high schools.

Regular class offerings include ceramics, collage and assemblage, drawing, painting, and watercolor illustration, among others. The Armory also offers letterpress classes for adults, housed onsite in a 2-room studio with Vandercook presses. The letterpress equipment was previously owned and operated by the Woman's Building (Los Angeles). The Armory acquired the letterpress equipment in December 1990, made possible by financial and logistical support from the GTE Yellow Pages. The Woman's Building closed the following year.

Art High 
Since 2006, the Armory's Art High program has made free after-school art classes and mentorship opportunities readily accessible to teens at parks and community centers throughout the region. In 2015, the Armory's Art High after school program for teens was recognized at a White House ceremony by First Lady Michelle Obama as among the most impactful programs of its kind in the nation.

The National Arts and Humanities Youth Program Award was the nation's highest honor for after-school and out-of-school-time arts and humanities programs—also known as Creative Youth Development programs—that celebrated the creativity of America's young people, particularly those from underserved communities. This award recognized and supported excellence in programs that open new pathways to learning, self-discovery, and achievement, from a wide range of urban and rural settings. The awards ended in 2017 under the Trump administration.

According to a press release issued by the White House, “Art High demonstrates the Armory's deep commitment to bringing the power of art into the lives of teens living in neighborhoods facing challenges like drugs, gangs, poverty, and racial divisions. Art High brings teens together that share a common interest in the arts and provides over 1,000 hours of free, fine arts and media arts classes to over 700 teens each year, including painting, drawing, silk screening, photography, filmmaking, graphic design, animation and more.

In popular culture

 The center was the primary location for the 2005 movie, Marilyn Hotchkiss' Ballroom Dancing and Charm School.

References

External links

Art museums and galleries in California
Museums in Pasadena, California
San Gabriel Valley
Art museums established in 1989
1989 establishments in California
Contemporary art galleries in the United States
Art in Greater Los Angeles
Arts centers in California